Gmina Batorz is a rural gmina (administrative district) in Janów Lubelski County, Lublin Voivodeship, in eastern Poland.

Villages
Gmina Batorz contains the villages and settlements of Aleksandrówka, Batorz, Błażek, Nowe Moczydła, Samary, Stawce, Stawce-Kolonia, Węglinek, Wola Studzieńska, Wola Studzieńska-Kolonia, and Wólka Batorska.

Neighbouring gminas
Gmina Batorz is bordered by the gminas of Godziszów, Modliborzyce, Szastarka, Zakrzew, and Zakrzówek.

References

External links
Polish official population figures 2006

Batorz
Janów Lubelski County